Caroline Bowman is an American theatre actress who has performed in multiple Broadway musicals, including Fame, Grease, Spamalot, Evita, Wicked, Kinky Boots, and the national tour of Frozen.

Education 
Bowman attended Glenelg High School in Howard County, Maryland, from which she graduated in 2006. Bowman received a B.F.A. in Musical Theatre in 2010 from Pennsylvania State University and received a 2014 Penn State Alumni Association Alumni Achievement Award, honoring alumni 35 and under.

Career 
Prior to graduation, Bowman toured with the musical Fame in China and performed as Rizzo in Grease in Turkey. She was also a performer with the Young Columbians. Shortly following that, Bowman returned to the states as Lady of the Lake in the Spamalot national tour. Very shortly after the Spamalot tour and her move to New York City, Bowman was offered an ensemble role in Wicked, understudying the lead role of Elphaba. Bowman left Wicked to take part in originating a new musical Kinky Boots in 2013. However, she exited the company shortly after its Broadway premiere to join the Evita national tour as Eva Perón.

After the conclusion of the Evita tour in October 2014, Bowman was offered the lead role of Elphaba in Wicked, beginning on December 16, 2014. She replaced Christine Dwyer. However, in late February, it was announced that due to an injury Bowman sustained, Dwyer would come back for a limited four-week engagement as emergency cover Elphaba. Jennifer DiNoia also returned for a short time until Bowman returned to the show in early April. On August 18, 2015, it was announced that Bowman would be departing Wicked in mid-September, with Rachel Tucker replacing her. From April 30 – May 8, 2016, Bowman reprised her role as Eva Perón in the Vancouver Opera's production of Evita, replacing the previously announced Jenn Colella. As part of the celebrations for the 45th anniversary of the Columbia Center for Theatrical Arts, Bowman was a narrator in a production of Joseph and the Amazing Technicolor Dreamcoat at Toby's Dinner Theatre.

It was announced on May 7, 2019, that Bowman would play Elsa in the national tour of Frozen, which opened in December 2019 at the Pantages Theatre in Los Angeles.

Performance credits

Personal life 
Bowman married her partner and Frozen national tour co-star Austin Colby on November 25, 2017. She also has a German Shepherd named Kodak. She is a long-time resident of Columbia, Maryland.

References

External links 

American musical theatre actresses
Actresses from Maryland
Living people
Penn State College of Arts and Architecture alumni
People from Columbia, Maryland
21st-century American actresses
American stage actresses
21st-century American women singers
Year of birth missing (living people)